Reuben Mosweu is a Botswana former footballer who played as a goalkeeper. He played one match for the Botswana national football team in 1999.

See also
Football in Botswana

References

External links

Living people
Association football goalkeepers
Botswana footballers
Botswana international footballers
Gilport Lions F.C. players
Year of birth missing (living people)